The 1973 Chatham Cup was the 46th annual nationwide knockout football competition in New Zealand.

The organisation of the cup was changed from previous years, with early stages being run in three large zones (northern, central, and southern), rather than by individual associations as had previously been the case. National League teams received a bye until the later stages of the competition. In all, 103 teams took part in the competition. Note: Different sources give different numberings for the rounds of the competition: some start round one with the beginning of the regional qualifications; others start numbering from the first national knock-out stage. The former numbering scheme is used in this article.

The 1973 final
The final was moved from the Basin Reserve for the first time since 1928, excluding replays. The 1973 final was - also excluding replays - the first to be held outside Wellington. Part of the reason for the move was because - for the first time ever - both finalists came from Auckland. This was only the second time (after 1971) that both finalists had come from the same urban area. The venue was to alternate between Auckland and Christchurch for several years from 1973.

Mount Wellington made up for their narrow loss in the marathon final of the 1972 Chatham Cup by inflicting a sound defeat on their neighbours from across the Waitematā Harbour. Coach Ken Armstrong added to his impressive tally of cup victories both on and off the field. Shore's cause was not helped when keeper Turner had to be substituted early on after an injury, but even without this handicap the Mount would have proven the stronger side. All the goals came from Mount Wellington's players, with two from Dave Taylor and one from John Houghton.

Results

Third Round

* Won on penalties by Rangers (4-3), Manurewa (6-5), and North End (6-5)

Fourth Round

Fifth Round

Sixth Round

Semi-finals

Final

References

Rec.Sport.Soccer Statistics Foundation New Zealand 1973 page
UltimateNZSoccer website 1973 Chatham Cup page

Chatham Cup
Chatham Cup
Chatham Cup
September 1973 sports events in New Zealand